Hillside railway station is a railway station in Soutport, England.

It may also refer to:

Australia 
 Hillside railway station, Queensland, a closed station on the Fassifern line
 Hillside railway station, Victoria, a closed station on the Bairnsdale line

United States 
 Hillside station (LIRR), a closed station on the Long Island Rail Road in New York